Heaton-with-Oxcliffe is a civil parish situated near the River Lune.  it is in the City of Lancaster and the English county of Lancashire.  The parish contains the villages of Heaton, Oxcliffe Hill, plus the area around Salt Ayre, and had a population of 2,225 recorded in the 2001 census,  decreasing to 2,059 at the 2011 census.

The Golden Ball Inn
The area around the Golden Ball Inn, in Oxcliffe, is locally known as Snatchems, as it was once a place that press gangs frequented.

Notable people
 

Mary Ann Bibby (c.1832–1910), New Zealand storekeeper, born in Heaton

See also

Listed buildings in Heaton-with-Oxcliffe

References

External links

Civil parishes in Lancashire
Geography of the City of Lancaster